Umāma bint Abī al-ʿĀṣ ibn al-Rabīʿ, was a granddaughter of the Islamic prophet Muhammad and Khadija, via their daughter Zaynab, and is thus also known as Umāma bint Zaynab. Muhammad was her maternal grandfather, and thus she is a member of his Ahl al-Bayt. She is also numbered among the Companions of the Prophet.

Biography
She was the daughter of Abu al-As ibn al-Rabi', who married Muhammad's eldest daughter Zaynab. She had one sibling, Ali. Her maternal aunts were Muhammad's daughters Ruqayya, Umm Kulthum and Fatima.

When Umama was a small child, Muhammad used to carry her on his shoulder while he prayed. He used to put her down to prostrate and then pick her up again as he rose. Muhammad once promised to give an onyx necklace to "her whom I love best." His wives expected him to give it to Aisha, but he presented it to Umama. On a different occasion, he gave her a gold ring that had arrived from the Emperor of Abyssinia.

Her aunt Fatima requested her husband Ali on her deathbed to marry her niece Umama because Umama had an intense attachment and love for Fatima's children Hasan, Umm Kulthum, Zaynab and especially Husayn. After Fatima died in 632, Umama married Ali. They had two sons, Hilal (also known as Muhammad al-Awsat or Muhammad the Middle) and Awn, both of whom died in Iran, with the latter having been killed in a battle against Qays ibn Murra (the governor of Khorasan), and the former dying naturally.

Ali was killed in 661, and Mu'awiya I proposed to Umama. She consulted al-Mughira ibn Nawfal ibn al-Harith about this. He said that she should not marry "the son of the liver-eater (Hind bint Utba)" and offered to deal with the problem for her. When she agreed, he said, "I will marry you myself." This marriage produced one son, Yahya. It is uncertain whether she had any descendants beyond this. Umama accompanied al-Mughira into exile at al-Safri. She died there , but it is also said that she died in 670 (50 AH).

Family tree

 indicates that the marriage order is disputed
 Note that direct lineage is marked in bold.

See also
 Hejaz
 Banu Hashim
 Muhammad's children
 Genealogy of Khadija's daughters

External links
The Tribe of Quraish

References

Women companions of the Prophet
Family of Muhammad
670 deaths
7th-century women
Wives of Shiite Imams
Banu Abd Shams